("Contemporary Papers") was a politicized literary journal published from 1920 to 1940. A group of adherents of the Russian Socialist-Revolutionary Party launched the journal during the Russian Civil War.

Headquartered in Paris, Sovremennye zapiski published the poetry, fiction, and articles of Russian emigrants, many of them highly respected writers and philosophers.

It is one of several Russian journals that published the early fiction of Vladimir Nabokov; Nabokov's novel Despair was first serialized in Sovremennye zapiski.

Featured titles
 Vladimir Nabokov
 Despair
 Laughter in the Dark
 The Gift
 Ivan Bunin
 Mitya's Love
 The Life of Arseniev
 Andrei Bely
 The Baptized Chinaman
 Aleksey Nikolayevich Tolstoy
 Sisters (first part of The Road to Calvary)

See also
February Revolution
October Revolution
Russian diaspora

Footnotes

Further reading
 M.V. Vishniak, Sovremennye zapiski: Vospominaniia redaktora. (Sovremennye zapiski: Reminiscences of an Editor). St. Petersburg, Russia: Logos, 1993.

1920 establishments in France
1940 disestablishments in France
Defunct literary magazines published in France
Magazines established in 1920
Magazines disestablished in 1940
Magazines published in Paris
Russian-language magazines